Pedro Henrique Bueno (born 14 June 1993) is a retired Brazilian professional footballer.

Biography

Career in club 
Henrique started his career in his native Brazil with Bragantino, playing two matches in Série B, as well as several in the regional state championships. He moved to France in 2015, signing for Championnat National club Fréjus Saint-Raphaël. He went on to make 12 league appearances, scoring once. Henrique spent the 2016–17 season with Béziers, before joining Ligue 2 side Chamois Niortais in the summer of 2017. He made his debut in the 0–0 draw with AC Ajaccio on 28 July 2017, coming on as a late substitute for Antoine Leautey.

He officially announced his retirement in August 2020, while he had not played since March because of recurring injuries. He now wishes resume his studies in Lyon to become an osteopath.

Private life 
He is of Catholic faith.

References

External links
 
 
 

1993 births
Living people
Footballers from São Paulo (state)
Brazilian footballers
Association football forwards
Association football wingers
Clube Atlético Bragantino players
ÉFC Fréjus Saint-Raphaël players
AS Béziers Hérault (football) players
Chamois Niortais F.C. players
Campeonato Brasileiro Série B players
Championnat National players
Ligue 2 players
People from Bariri